A manifesto is a public declaration of principles and intentions, often political in nature.

Manifesto may also refer to:

 Manifesto (horse)
 Il manifesto, an Italian newspaper

Film and television
 Manifesto (1988 film)
 Manifesto (2015 film)
 Manifesto, working title of the US TV series Manhunt: Unabomber, about Ted Kaczynski

Music
Manifesto (band), an American rock band
Manifesto Records
Manifesto (music venue), Hoorn, the Netherlands

Albums
Manifesto (Deadlock album), 2008
Manifesto (Inspectah Deck album), 2010
Manifesto (Pocket Full of Rocks album), 2007
Manifesto (Roxy Music album), or the title song, 1979
Manifesto, by The Souljazz Orchestra, 2008

Songs
 "Manifesto" (Superfly song), 2007
 "Manifesto", a song by The City Harmonic, 2010
 "Manifesto", a song by Planningtorock from W, 2011
 "MANIFESTO", a song by Tyler, the Creator from Call Me If You Get Lost, 2021

See also
 "Manafesto", a song by Manafest from Epiphany, 2005
Manifest (disambiguation)
Art manifesto, a recurrent feature associated with the avant-garde in Modernism
1890 Manifesto, a formal position regarding termination of practice of polygamy in the Church of Jesus Christ of Latter-Day Saints
The Manifesto Group, an alliance of British Labour MPs in the 1970s